Margaret Rizza (born 1929) is an English composer, primarily of church music. She taught singing at the Guildhall School of Music and Drama from 1977 to 1994.

Life
Margaret Rizza was born in 1929 into a musical family, where her mother played piano and her father was the organist for his local parish church. She attended the Royal College of Music from age 17 to study piano, at which she admits she was not particularly proficient. However, she soon switched to studying singing, and completed her training first at the National School of Opera in London and then at Siena and Rome in Italy, after which she pursued a career as an opera singer, using the name Margaret Lensky, for 25 years. During this time she sang at many of the leading venues for opera, working with conductors including Leonard Bernstein, Benjamin Britten and Igor Stravinsky. She married George Rizza, who emigrated from Italy to Scotland with his family aged 11, and who managed Chester Music and Novello for nearly 40 years. They had one son and one daughter.

From 1977 to 1994, she taught singing at the Guildhall School of Music and Drama. From 1986 onwards, she was increasingly involved in projects to bring music to the community and in aspects of spirituality. The community work involved taking groups of student musicians into prisons, hospitals, hospices, inner city schools, centres for sufferers from Multiple Sclerosis, schools for the blind, and working with people with physical and learning difficulties. She also worked with the World Community for Christian Meditation, leading retreats, workshops on vocal and choral skills, and days of prayer and music. Until 2008, she also conducted vocal workshops and masterclasses at the Dartington International Summer School. She turned to composing music relatively late in life, when Sister Pamela Hayes, who was a good friend, asked her to write some music which would form an introduction to prayer at an international conference. Despite an initial reluctance, she produced six pieces of music for the conference, and in 1997 released them on a CD. Most of her composition has been of church music, and she has been involved in training and directing choral groups and choirs since 1989. By 2013, she had been involved in the production of ten CDs of choral music, acting principally as conductor.

As well as her work in Britain, she has conducted conferences and seminars featuring her music in Ireland, Malaysia, New Zealand, Singapore, and the United States. BBC Radio Kent gave her an award in 2003 for the best interview on prayer and music, and in 2004 she received an Andrew Cross Award for religious journalism. In 2007, the English conductor Harry Christophers commissioned her to write a choral work for The Sixteen, a choir and period instrument orchestra. This led to her developing a new style of writing, which she calls "classical contemporary", and the composition entitled Ave Generosa was released on CD, sung by The Sixteen and conducted by Christophers. It premiered at the Queen Elizabeth Hall on London's South Bank in 2008, and in the United States in 2009.

Works, editions and recordings
 Ave generosa
 Choral Works (Mysterium amoris) Gaudete Ensemble, Eamonn Dougan. Naxos

References

English classical composers
Classical composers of church music
English Christians
Living people
1929 births
Women classical composers
Academics of the Guildhall School of Music and Drama
20th-century classical composers
20th-century English singers
21st-century classical composers
21st-century English composers
20th-century English women singers
20th-century British composers
21st-century English women musicians
20th-century women composers
21st-century women composers